Kōshien (甲子園) often refers to:
Koshien, Nishinomiya, Hyōgo Prefecture, a neighborhood of Nishinomiya, Hyōgo, Japan
Koshien Stadium, a baseball stadium in Koshien which is the venue of the annual high school baseball tournaments
Kōshien baseball tournament, two annual baseball tournaments played by Japanese high schools nationwide

Kōshien may also refer to:

Places
Kōshien Station on the Hanshin Main Line in Nishinomiya, Hyōgo
Kōshien Hotel in Nishinomiya, Hyōgo, now part of Mukogawa Women's University

Sport
Kōshien baseball tournament, high school tournaments generally referred to as Kōshien
Japanese High School Baseball Championship, commonly called Summer Kōshien 
Japanese High School Baseball Invitational Tournament, commonly called Spring Kōshien
Kōshien (series), Japan-exclusive high school baseball-themed video games released for various systems
Koshien Bowl, an American football championship held in Koshien Stadium

Education
Koshien Junior College in Nishinomiya, Hyōgo
Koshien University in Takarazuka, Hyōgo